Vârghiș is a commune in Covasna County, Transylvania, Romania. It is composed of a single village, Vârghiș.

History 

It formed part of the Székely Land region of the historical Transylvania province. From 1876 until 1920, the village belonged to the Háromszék County of the Kingdom of Hungary, when after the Treaty of Trianon, it became part of Romania.

Demographics

The commune has an absolute Székely Hungarian majority. According to the 2011 census, it has a population of 1,628, of which 99.26% or 1,616 are Hungarian.

References

Communes in Covasna County
Localities in Transylvania
hu:Vargyas